Carlos Arena (born 2 August 1975) is a Mexican swimmer. He competed in two events at the 1996 Summer Olympics.

References

External links

1975 births
Living people
Mexican male swimmers
Olympic swimmers of Mexico
Swimmers at the 1996 Summer Olympics
Place of birth missing (living people)